Sisir Mancha is an auditorium located on Acharya Jagadish Chandra Bose Road in Kolkata, West Bengal, India. This auditorium is regularly used for Bengali theatres. The auditorium is adjacent to Rabindra Sadan-Nandan Complex. The theatre auditorium is named after Bengali dramatist Sisir Kumar Bhaduri  and it was established in 1978.

References

Bengali theatre
Tourist attractions in Kolkata
Culture of Kolkata
Theatres in Kolkata
Auditoriums in Kolkata